Ben Fee (张恨棠/木云) (September 3, 1908 – July 3, 1978) was an American writer and labor organizer who rose to prominence in the Chinatowns of San Francisco and New York in the mid-twentieth century. He was president of the Chinese Workers Mutual Aid Association and leader of the Chinese section of the United States Communist Party.

Early years 
Fee was born in Canton, China. Fee's mother was "known as a 'bomb thrower' . . . and [his] father . . . a 'draft-dodger'"; he grew up reading Marx and Lenin, and from his early years was aware of racism against California's Chinese population and felt that organized labor could be a solution.

In 1924, when the San Francisco restaurant Almond Blossom refused to serve Fee because he was Asian and other customers might object, he returned the next day with ten white friends who each ordered porterhouse steak, the most expensive item on the menu. Then Fee came in and was refused service on the same grounds given the day before. Fee then confronted the "customers" who, upon learning of the restaurant's policy, walked out of the restaurant, leaving the steaks cooking, unpaid for.

Labor organizer 
The son of a Chinese-American interpreter Fee moved to the United States at the age of 13. In 1934 he was employed by the International Ladies' Garment Workers' Union to organize Chinese garment workers in San Francisco. However his subsequent membership of and advocacy for the Communist Party alienated the Chinatown establishment and the union, which terminated his employment in 1938.

Following marital problems and a difficult divorce, Fee relocated to New York and resumed his advocacy for organized labor. In the 1940s he was active in the Chinese Students Association, the Alaska Cannery Workers Union and the Chinese Workers Mutual Aid Association.

Literary work 
Fee rapidly became a prominent part of the New York Chinatown of the 1940s, and a writer of short works depicting the Chinese American experience of the post-World War II  era. His mix of old-style cultural mores was popularized by author and vaudeville producer Frank Chin who caricatured Fee as a mix of the American "Wild West" and traditional Chinese thinking. Chin described Fee as:

References

Further reading
 "Ben Fee: The Fox and the Tiger" by Frank Chin, in Bulletproof Buddhists and Other Essays, 1998.
 "Ben's Way" by Don Wong in Chinese Americans Past & Present by Don Wong and Irene Dea Collier, 1977. 
 "On 'Mountain of Gold,' Seamstresses Find Pay Is Low," The New York Times, August 5, 1972

1908 births
1978 deaths
American civil rights activists
American communists
American trade union leaders
American writers of Chinese descent
Chinese emigrants to the United States
Writers from San Francisco
Communists from California